Ronny Thielemann (born 15 November 1973) is a German former professional football player and current manager of FSV Zwickau.

In March 2018, Thielemann acquired the football instructor license at the German Football Association.

Playing career
Thielemann was born in Schlema. He played 39 games in the Bundesliga for Hansa Rostock and Energie Cottbus.

Coaching career
Thielemann begang his coaching career with FC Energie Cottbus II as an assistant manager from April 2008 to June 2010. He then worked one year as the manager FC Erzgebirge Aue's U19 squad, before he in July 2011 was appointed as the assistant manager of 1. FC Magdeburg. On 25 October 2011, he took over the team after manager Wolfgang Sandhowe was sacked. He held the job until 20 March 2012 where a new manager was appointed.

In the next two years, Thielemann worked with the U17 and U19 teams at the club. From the 2014–15 season, he was appointed as the assistant manager for the first team again, this time under manager Jens Härtel. On 12 November 2018, both manager Härtel and Thielemann himself was released.

Härtel and Thielemann continued together in the new year, when Härtel was appointed as the manager of FC Hansa Rostock on 9 January 2019, where he took Thielemann with him as his assistant.

In February 2023, he was appointed as the new head coach of FSV Zwickau.

References

External links

1973 births
Living people
German footballers
FC Erzgebirge Aue players
FC Hansa Rostock players
FC Energie Cottbus players
FC Energie Cottbus II players
FC Sachsen Leipzig players
FC Carl Zeiss Jena players
Bundesliga players
1. FC Magdeburg managers
FSV Zwickau managers
3. Liga  managers
Association football midfielders
German football managers
FC Hansa Rostock non-playing staff